Midway is an unincorporated community in Reddish Township Lewis County, in the U.S. state of Missouri.

The community was named for its central location relative to Deer Ridge and Monticello.

References

Unincorporated communities in Lewis County, Missouri
Unincorporated communities in Missouri